James Brass is a fictional character portrayed by Paul Guilfoyle on the CBS crime drama CSI: Crime Scene Investigation and its sequel CSI: Vegas. He made his first screen appearance in the show's pilot, broadcast on October 6, 2000.  He was credited in 317 episodes. Guilfoyle's departure was announced in March 2014 and his character left on May 7, 2014. He returned for the series finale, Immortality, and appeared in two episodes of CSI: Vegas.

Appearances
The character appeared in every episode during his run, with the exception of "Felonious Monk" from season two, "Gum Drops" and "The Unusual Suspect" from season six, "Leaving Las Vegas" from season seven, "Blood Moon", "All That Cremains" and "Cello and Goodbye" from season eleven and "Bittersweet", "Seeing Red", "Malice in Wonderland" and "Dune and Gloom" from season twelve, "Wild Flowers" and "Dead Air" from season thirteen, "Last Supper", "Killer Moves", "Consumed" from season fourteen. He appeared in 303 episodes. He appeared in two episodes of the first season of the sequel CSI: Vegas.

Departure
On March 24, 2014 it was announced that Jim would be leaving CSI: Crime Scene Investigation by the end of season 14. Guilfoyle was written out of the show after the producers decided to end his character's storyline. The actor found out that he would not be returning for the fifteenth season the week before the announcement. Executive producers Carol Mendelsohn and Don McGill stated "In a show about forensics, fans always looked forward to the handcuffs coming out, and Capt. Brass putting his spin on the crime of the week, just as Paul Guilfoyle put his indelible stamp on the character and the show. He will be missed." Jim left the team on May 7, 2014 but returned for the series finale in season 15.

Background
Brass enlisted in the United States Marine Corps fresh out of high school and did two tours of duty in the Vietnam War. He graduated from Seton Hall University with a degree in history.  After the war, he joined the Newark Police. Brass spent 20 years working his way up to homicide detective in Newark, New Jersey. Before he became a homicide detective, he was assigned to Vice.  While working in Vice, he worked hard to clean up his department, earning the enmity of many of his former colleagues (and the nickname "Squeaky", as in "squeaky clean"). Brass, under stress, sometimes drank and would cover it up by popping cough drops to hide the smell of alcohol on his breath (episode 415, "Early Rollout"). While his wife Nancy was having an affair with Vice cop Mike O'Toole, Brass was busy with his own affair with another member of the vice squad, Annie Kramer, who later moved to Los Angeles and was promoted to captain. Brass claims later that it was Nancy's affair that ruined their marriage, rather than the other way around, and that she eventually just wanted a way out (episode 520, "Hollywood Brass"). Brass transferred out of New Jersey in the 1990s and came to Las Vegas.

Career
Early on, Brass and other officers new to the force were courted by Undersheriff McKeen in regards to taking bribes, the entire group having been invited to McKeen's for a barbecue. Brass made it clear he was not for sale and said he was not invited to any more gatherings after that (episode "For Warrick"). However, he was very much a player and a partier, describing work as "an interruption to his fun". He had a fling with former officer Ann-Marie Tolsom, his name later turning up on a list of those who had had physical relations with her when she was believed killed by her ex-husband. (She turned out to still be alive after her ex was killed in prison and it was revealed she had framed him and faked her death; episode "The List".) Brass eventually left his wilder side behind, and eventually began running the CSI department, more as an administrator than as an investigator. Showing as an example of how much he trusts the team, Brass has stated that he would want Gil Grissom's CSI team to investigate his murder; he gave Grissom power of attorney rights should anything happen to him, which proved useful when Grissom chose to go ahead with his risky but life-saving surgery when he was shot.

Brass used to have Grissom's job as the supervisor of the CSI team. After young CSI Holly Gribbs was murdered on her first day in the field, he lost his position to Grissom. Brass was then given the position as a homicide detective, usually serving as the legal muscle for the CSI team and the one who does most of the arresting and interrogating of suspects. Brass is shown to favor heavy-caliber weaponry including a Heckler and Koch USP .45 handgun and a Remington 870 shotgun.

In the two-part episode "A Bullet Runs Through It", Brass tries to counsel Detective Sofia Curtis, who believes she may have accidentally killed another officer in a chaotic shoot-out with a gang of drug dealers. He later is stunned and guilt-ridden to realize that he was actually the one that killed the officer. Later at the officer's funeral, his widow approached, and when Brass tried to explain how sorry he was, she told him that she knew it was not his fault.

While Brass could never be accused of being a "soft cop", he has a reputation for adhering to the rules and witty sarcasm when interviewing suspects. In the episode "Who and What", after the FBI's Jack Malone slams a suspect's head on the table, Brass rushes in and pulls him off, saying "If you want to rendition him to Gitmo, be my guest. But in this house, we play by the rules." In the episode "You Kill Me", after David Hodges creates a fictional story in which Brass uses his night stick on a suspect, fellow lab tech Henry comments "Captain Brass isn't the type of cop that smacks suspects around."

At the end of season 8, in "For Gedda", Brass tells CSI Warrick Brown "I hope you remember how lucky you are", after Warrick is cleared of a murder charge. Warrick is murdered at the end of the episode. In the season 9 premiere, "For Warrick", Brass is shown to be stricken with guilt over these words.

Relationships with colleagues
Brass has a good working relationship with other members of the team. Protective of his colleagues, he is usually the one to draw his gun and does not like it when the CSIs try to take dangerous matters, like arresting armed suspects, into their own hands. He also gets on Grissom's case for not drawing his firearm, even in appropriate situations.

He is close friends with former night shift supervisor Gil Grissom. During Season 6, when he was shot, he gave Grissom the power of attorney. When Grissom left, he developed a friendship with Ray Langston. He had some disagreements with Langston over dealing with serial killer Nate Haskell in Season 10 ("Meat Jekyll"). In the last episode of Season 11, he tried to protect him by concealing evidence that would indicate Langston had crossed the line from self-defense to murder when Langston killed Haskell.

Early in the series, Brass is tough on Warrick, and there is obvious tension between them in several episodes, especially when there was an officer-involved shooting, with Brass believing Warrick to be reckless, and Warrick feeling Brass to be holding him back, but they eventually bury the hatchet, and become good friends and coworkers. When Warrick is murdered, Brass is visibly upset, especially after his ill-timed statement to Warrick immediately before his murder about how lucky he was.

Regarding Sara, he is somewhat sympathetic to her, and it is implied he is aware of her personal life in which she witnessed her mother murder her father. He does, however, have to occasionally chastise her when she becomes overzealous and runs into a scene before the officers have a chance to secure it. He also sees shades of himself in her when he notices her popping cough drops at a scene, presumably to hide the smell of alcohol on her breath.

Brass has an excellent working relationship with Nick Stokes. Brass treats him much like a nephew, and save for Grissom himself, his relationship with Nick is the friendliest among the CSI's. When Nick is abducted and buried alive, Brass pulls out all the stops to ensure Nick is safely found.

Concerning Greg Sanders, Brass sometimes likes to poke fun at Sanders at the latter's expense, often in a light-hearted manner, like saying something was stuck to Grissom's shoe when they walked into a scene together. He doesn't have much interaction with him early in the series, but once Sanders crosses from lab tech to CSI, they begin working more cases together, and they have a mutual respect.

Personal life
Brass has an estranged daughter, Ellie Rebecca Brass, who is not biologically his (unbeknownst to her). As he explains it to Warrick Brown in the episode "Ellie": "Call it the mailman's. Ellie doesn't know." In fact, Ellie's biological father is former New Jersey Vice cop Mike O'Toole, whom Brass discovered to be dirty. Ellie works as a prostitute in Los Angeles, to the deep disappointment of her father. Despite her rebellious behavior, Brass still loves her deeply, and keeps a picture of her as a child on his desk in his office. When he discovers that she is doing drugs, he keeps after her until she cleans up, but their relationship remains difficult and strained. Brass is shot by William Cutler, a wanted suspect in a triple homicide. When he is in the hospital in critical condition, in the season six finale "Way to Go", Ellie seems more concerned with the pension than her father's likelihood of survival—which is probably why Brass gave his power of attorney to colleague and friend Gil Grissom, who saved Brass's life by having him undergo surgery to remove the bullet. At the end of that episode, Brass is surrounded by his other family: the CSI night shift team, who watched over him through his ordeal. At the end of the seventh season premiere, "Built To Kill, Part 1", Brass is seen in a tattoo parlor, having the date of his shooting (May 11, 2006) tattooed just below the bullet scar.

In the Season 13 finale  "Skin in the Game", Ellie is apparently kidnapped by a serial killer re-enacting deaths from Dante's Inferno. CSI Morgan Brody goes undercover but is herself kidnapped by the same killer. Brass is emotionally distraught and calls Ellie's mother, who flies to Las Vegas and badgers her ex-husband to find Ellie. When Morgan frees herself and she and Ellie are escaping the killer, Ellie shoots Morgan, nearly killing her—revealing herself to be the mastermind behind the killings. Ellie then murders her own mother and attempts to murder Brass, all due to Ellie's acknowledged "daddy issues". Brass, when realizing that Ellie is the killer, walks heartbroken right up to the gun she is pointing at him, but Ellie does not pull the trigger; Brass takes the gun from her and Ellie is arrested.

References

External links
 Jim Brass Biography

CSI: Crime Scene Investigation characters
CSI: Vegas
Fictional characters from New Jersey
Television characters introduced in 2000
Fictional Las Vegas Police Department detectives
Fictional police captains
Fictional United States Marine Corps personnel
Fictional Vietnam War veterans